Beik Baghi (also Romanized as Beik Baghi; also known as Bāi Bagh, Bāy Bāgh, Beg Bāgh, and Beyg Bāghī) is a village in Ojarud-e Shomali Rural District, in the Central District of Germi County, Ardabil Province, Iran. At the 2006 census, its population was 122, in 25 families.

References 

Towns and villages in Germi County